The International Institute for Higher Education is a private degree granting institution for higher education in the areas of management, science and technology. The Institute currently offers programs in management science, engineering and computer information systems.

Academics
IIHEM offers five-year programs in two Schools:

 School of Engineering:
 Industrial Engineering
 Software and Network Engineering
 Civil Engineering
 School of Business Administration:
 Management Science with majors in Finance, Marketing or Management Information Systems
 Marketing and Communication

Campus
The IIHEM campus is located in one of the prime residential areas of Rabat, and occupies a 12,000-m² area with over 7,000-m² of built space in three stories.

Partnerships
IIHEM students and graduates wishing to pursue their undergraduate or graduate studies in the United States can benefit from the general IIHEM-TIEC partnership agreement.

See also
 List of universities in Morocco
 Science and technology in Morocco

External links
IIHEM Website
IIHEM Website (english)

Universities in Morocco